The British Heart Foundation (BHF) is a cardiovascular research charity in the United Kingdom. It funds medical research related to heart and circulatory diseases and their risk factors, and runs influencing work aimed at shaping public policy and raising awareness.

In 2021, a study conducted by YouGov ranked the British Heart Foundation as the top charity or organisation in the UK by percent of adults who hold a positive opinion of the organisation.

Foundation
The British Heart Foundation was founded in 1961 by a group from the queens  medical professionals who were concerned about the increasing death rate from cardiovascular disease. They wanted to fund extra research into the causes, diagnosis, treatment, and prevention of heart and circulatory diseases.

It is a major funder and authority in cardiovascular research, education, and care, and relies predominantly on voluntary donations to meet its aims. In order to increase income and maximise the impact of its work, it also works with other organizations to combat premature death and disability from cardiovascular disease.

Activities

The British Heart Foundation’s main focus is to fund cardiovascular research, aiming to spend around £100 million a year funding scientists around the UK. They are currently funding over 1000 research projects.

Centres of Research Excellence
Since 2008 the BHF has been investing in Centres of Research Excellence. The six current centres bring together scientists from a number of disciplines to work on research projects to beat heart and circulatory disease.
The current Centres of Research are:
 University of Cambridge
 University of Edinburgh
 University of Glasgow
 Imperial College London
 King’s College London
 University of Oxford

Centres of Regenerative Medicine
In 2013 the BHF committed to funding three multi-institution Centres of Regenerative Medicine, investing £7.5 million over four years to fund scientists looking for new treatments for heart failure.

BHF Clinical Research Collaborative
The British Heart Foundation Clinical Research Collaborative was launched in 2019, hosted by the British Cardiovascular Society. Designed to support the planning of high-quality national cardiovascular research, it brings together professional societies, research groups and patient and public involvement to better coordinate and prioritise research efforts. It also launched a fund to support the development of clinical research in cardiovascular disease, providing grants from £5,000-20,000, and all topic ideas will be considered.

Other patients and public activities include:
 Information – BHF provides information to help the public reduce their own heart health risk. It also provides numerous resources for patients to better manage their conditions, including the Heart Matters magazine and online hubs on risk factors such as blood pressure and obesity.
 Campaigning – BHF influences government to establish policies that minimise the risk of developing heart and circulatory disease, including the funding of reports and research
 Support – offering advice to those with heart conditions via their website, information booklets or heart helpline.
 Life saving skills – the BHF currently offers free CPR kits to schools and is working with the Department of Health to distribute defibrillators throughout England.

In 2020, The British Heart Foundation had a net income of just over £107m. In the same year, the BHF spent over £93m on funding cardiovascular research.

The Global Cardiovascular Research Funders Forum
The charity announced, in June 2021, that it had joined forces with leading cardiovascular research funders around the world to form the Global Cardiovascular Research Funders Forum (GCRFF). In addition to the British Heart Foundation, the Forum's members are:
 The American Heart Association
  (The Danish Heart Foundation}
  (The Dutch Heart Foundation) 
  (German Centre for Cardiovascular Research: DZHK)
 The Leducq Foundation
 The Heart and Stroke Foundation of Canada
 The Canadian Institutes of Health Research
 The National Heart Foundation of Australia
 The National Heart Foundation of New Zealand
 The National Heart, Lung, and Blood Institute (NHLBI)

The Big Beat Challenge
In 2019, The British Heart Foundation launched the Big Beat Challenge, a global competition with a single award of £30m for the research team who proposed a transformational solution to any cardiovascular disease. The Big Beat Challenge was open to applications from any country globally, and accepted proposals in any research area related to cardiovascular disease. Based on a panel of BHF research-funding committee members and an International Advisory panel, a shortlist was finalised in January 2020 to include a robotic heart, a ‘Google map’ of atherosclerosis, a project harnessing artificial intelligence (AI) and wearables to create a cardiovascular digital twin of a patient, and a genetic cure for inherited heart conditions.

CureHeart, led by co-PIs Professor Hugh Christian Watkins and Professor Christine Seidman, which aims to find a cure for genetic cardiomyopathies, was announced as the winner of the Big Beat Challenge in July 2022.

Fundraising
BHF fundraising events accounted for nearly £54m of income in 2019-20.

The BHF won the bid to be named as the London Marathon charity partner for the 2022 raise, aiming to raise £3m through the partnership to invest in clinical research.

The annual London to Brighton Bike Ride is a flagship fundraising event, with over 16,000 cyclists and raising over £2.8m. The event was cancelled two years in a row, in 2020 and 2021, and is expected to return in 2022 with PureGym as the sponsor.

Other annual campaigns include National Heart Month (held throughout February), Wear Red Day and The Big Donation as well as many other campaigns to recruit volunteers, raise awareness of BHF, increase retail sales and increase donations.

Retail Division

The BHF runs the largest network of charity shops in the UK, and generates income through online sales too. As of 2021, they run around 730 shops which include over 160 furniture and electrical shops selling up to 85,000 items daily. The BHF Retail division makes roughly £30 million every year.

Facts and figures
 Since the BHF was established, the annual number of deaths from heart and circulatory diseases in the UK has fallen by around half.
 Heart and circulatory diseases cause a quarter of all deaths in the UK, totally around 160,000 deaths.
 Around 1.4 million people alive in the UK today have survived a heart attack.
 Since 1961 the UK death rate from heart and circulatory diseases has declined by over three quarters.
 Healthcare costs relating to heart and circulatory diseases are estimated at £9 billion each year.
 Over 3,800 Heartstart UK schemes to educate people what to do in various emergency situations (not just cardiac emergencies). More than 3.5 million people have been trained by Heartstart UK in schools (for example via the Saving Londoners' Lives project) and the community.
 Every year 1 in every 145 babies are born in the UK with a congenital heart defect.

Criticism

Animal research
In June 2011, the British Heart Foundation was one of several health charities, alongside Cancer Research UK, the Alzheimer's Society and Parkinson's UK, targeted by animal rights pressure group Animal Aid, in a series of newspaper advertisements urging the public not to donate to the organizations under the pretence of funding experiments on animals. The pressure group argued that 100 dogs had died since 1988 during the experiments.

The BHF has responded to these criticisms by saying the charity only funds animal research after grant applications have gone through an independent peer review process and follows the three Rs principles when considering such grants.

Wealth screening
In 2016, the BHF was fined by the UK Information Commissioner's Office which ruled that the charity had breached data protection legislation by employing external bodies to analyse the financial status of supporters in order to appeal to them for further donations, a practice known as 'wealth screening'. The BBC reported that, "Information Commissioner Elizabeth Denham said donors had not been informed of the charity's practices, and were therefore unable to consent or object to them. She also suggested other charities could also be engaged in similar activities. The same BBC report noted that the charity's chief executive had stated that "the ICO's conclusions were 'wrong, disproportionate and inconsistent […] We find the decision surprising, as earlier this year in June the ICO praised our data handling. Our trustees will therefore consider whether it's in the interests of our supporters and beneficiaries to challenge this decision."

See also
 American Heart Association
 Heart and Stroke Foundation of Canada
 Heart Disease Research Foundation
 National Heart Foundation of Australia
 United OneHeart Foundation
 Heart Protection Study

References

External links
 
 
 

Health charities in the United Kingdom
Health in the London Borough of Camden
Heart disease organizations
Organisations based in the London Borough of Camden
Organizations established in 1961
1961 establishments in the United Kingdom